Maria Josefa Cruz (August 21, 1921 – April 14, 1992), better known by her screen name Matimtiman Cruz, was a Filipina radio personality, actress and comedian.

Career
Matimtiman started her movie career with Sampaguita Pictures.  She later switched to comedy becoming one of the favorite and highly paid comedian in the 1950s.  She was featured in 96 films from 1955 to 1988, mostly performing comedic roles.

Personal life
She was married to Perfecto Ursua Manego, writer/director - in DZRH, DZPI and channel 11 (died December 1968), wherein they had 4 children - Veronidia, Angelito, Perfecto "Jun Cruz", and Wilfredo "Willy Cruz".

Her longtime partner, Jaime Llave, an actor-comedian who was best known by his screen name Balot - stood as the father of her children.

Awards
Before she joined the movies, Matimtiman was voted as Miss Batangas in 1937 as well as Bb. Ilang-ilang ng Silangan (Miss Ilang-ilang of the East).
 
As an actress, Matimtiman was nominated for Best Supporting Actress at the 1970 FAMAS Awards, then the only film awards in the Philippines, for the 1969 movie "Kapatid Ko Ang Aking Ina".

Death
Matimtiman died on April 14, 1992 at the Philippine Heart Center in Quezon City, Metro Manila, Philippines at the age of 70 years old.

Filmography
An incomplete list of movies Matimtiman Cruz appeared in:

References

External links

1921 births
Filipino women comedians
People from Manila
Actresses from Batangas
1992 deaths
20th-century Filipino actresses
Burials at the Loyola Memorial Park
20th-century comedians
Filipino radio personalities
Filipino film actresses
Filipino beauty pageant winners